Jhondaniel (Ostos) Medina (born February 8, 1993) is a Venezuelan professional baseball pitcher who is a free agent. He was originally signed as an amateur free agent by the Baltimore Orioles on December 14, 2009 and was traded to the Pittsburgh Pirates in exchange for Yamaico Navarro on November 30, 2012. He signed as a minor league free agent with the Cubs on December 28, 2016.

Medina was selected as a member of the Venezuela national baseball team at the 2017 World Baseball Classic.

References

External links

1993 births
Living people
Aberdeen IronBirds players
Altoona Curve players
Baseball pitchers
Bradenton Marauders players
Cardenales de Lara players
Dominican Summer League Orioles players
Venezuelan expatriate baseball players in the Dominican Republic
Indianapolis Indians players
Inland Empire 66ers of San Bernardino players
Mobile BayBears players
Sportspeople from Maracay
Tennessee Smokies players
West Virginia Power players
World Baseball Classic players of Venezuela
2017 World Baseball Classic players